Doroshenko is a Ukrainian family of the Cossack Hetmanate. Two of its members were the Hetman of Ukrainian Cossacks.

Notable family members 
 Mykhailo Doroshenko (? – after 1628), senior of the Registered Cossacks
 Petro Doroshenko (1627–1698), Hetman of Zaporizhian Host
 Dmytro Doroshenko (1882–1951), Ukrainian politician, government official, historian (real last name Klymchenko-Doroshenko)

References

External links

 Doroshenko family. Ukraine, the history of Great Nation.
 Doroshenko family. NANU Institute of History.

 
Cossack Hetmanate
Zaporizhian Cossacks noble families